Lynda Marie Scott is a former New Zealand politician of the National Party.

Early life
Scott trained as a nurse in Wellington and then became a doctor in Auckland. She worked as a geriatrician. For a time, she also served as a director of Blenheim radio company Marlborough Media, which owned Sounds FM and Easy FM.

Member of Parliament

Scott was first elected to Parliament in the 1999 election, winning the South Island seat of Kaikoura. She replaced Doug Kidd, a long-serving National MP who had opted to become a list MP. In 2002, she became National's spokesperson for health. On 21 July 2004, however, she announced that she would retire from politics at the next election, returning to her "first love", medicine.

References

Living people
New Zealand National Party MPs
New Zealand nurses
Year of birth missing (living people)
Women members of the New Zealand House of Representatives
Members of the New Zealand House of Representatives
New Zealand MPs for South Island electorates
New Zealand women nurses
21st-century New Zealand politicians
21st-century New Zealand women politicians